This is a list of public housing estates on Lantau Island, Hong Kong.

Overview

Fu Tung Estate 

Fu Tung Estate is located near Tung Chung station. Built on the reclaimed land of North Lantau New Town Phase 1 project, it is the first public housing estate in Tung Chung. It consists of 3 residential buildings completed in 1997.

Yu Tung Court 

Yu Tung Court is a Home Ownership Scheme court in Tung Chung, located near Fu Tung Estate and Tung Chung station. Built on the reclaimed land of North Lantau New Town Phase 1 project, it is the first and the only HOS court in Tung Chung. It has a total of 5 blocks built in 1997, together with Fu Tung Estate.

Yat Tung Estate 

Yat Tung Estate is located in Tung Chung. It is divided into 'Yat Tung (I) Estate', completed in 2001 and comprising 13 blocks of Concord 1 and Harmony 1 types, and 'Yat Tung (II) Estate', completed in 2004 – 2005 and comprising 12 blocks of Harmony 1 and NCB types.

Residents of Yat Tung Estate have appealed to the government to extend the Tung Chung line to Yat Tung to ease their transportation problems. Yat Tung Estate currently has 36,913 residents. They claimed that when they moved in 11 years ago, the Housing Bureau's documents indicated a MTR station at the estate. The residents currently have to take a 10-minute bus journey to Tung Chung station.

The proposed Tung Chung West station would be located adjacent to Yat Tung Estate. It is tentatively slated to open between 2020 and 2024.

Yat Tung (I) Estate

 Yat Tung (II) Estate

Tung Chung Artwalk 
The Hong Kong Housing Authority established the Tung Chung Artwalk at Yat Tung Estate, so as to promote public art at public housing estates. It is the first public housing estate to have a large public art scheme launched by the Hong Kong Housing Authority. Sixteen works of art selected from 316 outstanding submissions for the competition "New Face of Heritage" were firstly displayed in the estate in 2002 while another 10 artworks were added in 2006.

Lung Hin Court 

Lung Hin Court is a Home Ownership Scheme court in Tai O. It is located in on the reclaimed land in east Tai O, next to Lung Tin Estate. The court is the Phase 2 development of Lung Tin Estate. It was originally planned for rehousing people affected by the Tai O development, but it was transferred to HOS units in 1999 since the clearance scale was largely reduced.

Lung Tin Estate and Tin Lee Court 

Lung Tin Estate and Tin Lee Court are the sole Hong Kong Housing Authority public rental estate and HOS estate in south Lantau Island respectively. It is located in on the reclaimed land in east Tai O.

Tin Lee Court was once part of Lung Tin Estate. Yet due to high vacant rate of the building, it has been converted to HOS estate and sold at 2014, and the original residents were migrated.

Ngan Wan Estate 

Ngan Wan Estate is located in Ngan Kwong Wan Road, Mui Wo, a short distance from Mui Wo Ferry Pier. It consists of 4 residential blocks completed in 1988.

Ngan Ho Court and Ngan Wai Court 

Ngan Ho Court and Ngan Wai Court are Home Ownership Scheme courts in Ngan Kwong Wan Road, Mui Wo.

Ngan Ho Court comprises 2 blocks with 529 flats in total while Ngan Wai Court comprises 1 block with 170 flats in total. They are the only HOS courts on outlying islands (except Tung Chung) which were sold in 2010's. They were sold in 2017 and completed in 2018.

Ying Tung Estate

Ying Tung Estate is built on the Northeastern Coast of Tung Chung, next to Ying Tung Road in 2018, it consists of 4 blocks, namely Ying Chui House, Ying Yuet House, Ying Hei House and Ying Fook House.

Mun Tung Estate 

Mun Tung Estate is located in Tung Chung. It consists of 4 residential blocks completed in 2018.

Yu Tai Court 

Yu Tai Court is located in Tung Chung near Yat Tung Estate. It comprises two blocks with totally 1,226 flats at a saleable area of 25.8 square metres to 53.1 square metres. The flats were sold in 2018 and is expected to commence in 2020.

Yu Nga Court

See also
 Public housing in Hong Kong
 List of public housing estates in Hong Kong

References 

 
 
Tai O
Mui Wo
Tung Chung